Lieutenant General Nicholas Robert Macrae Borton,  is a senior British Army officer, who currently serves as commander of the Allied Rapid Reaction Corps.

Military career
Educated at Canford School and the University of Stirling, Borton was commissioned into the Royal Highland Fusiliers on 4 September 1988. After serving as a staff officer in the headquarters of Multi-National Division (South-East) (Iraq), he became commanding officer of the Royal Highland Fusiliers, 2nd Battalion, The Royal Regiment of Scotland in 2008 and was awarded the Distinguished Service Order on 6 March 2009 for service in Afghanistan. He was appointed commander of 16 Air Assault Brigade in April 2013, Director of Overseas Operations at the Ministry of Defence in September 2015, and General Officer Commanding the 3rd (United Kingdom) Division in December 2016. Borton became Chief of Staff (Operations), Permanent Joint Headquarters in February 2019, and commander of the Allied Rapid Reaction Corps in December 2021.

Borton also serves as both the Colonel of the Royal Regiment of Scotland, and the Colonel Commandant of the Army Air Corps.

Publications

References

|-
 

British Army lieutenant generals
British Army personnel of the Iraq War
British Army personnel of the War in Afghanistan (2001–2021)
British military personnel of The Troubles (Northern Ireland)
Companions of the Distinguished Service Order
Living people
Members of the Order of the British Empire
Year of birth missing (living people)